The Asx turn
is a structural feature in proteins and polypeptides. It consists of three amino acid residues (labeled i, i+1 and i+2) in which residue i is an aspartate (Asp) or asparagine (Asn) that forms a hydrogen bond from its sidechain CO group to the mainchain NH group of residue i+2. About 14% of Asx residues present in proteins belong to Asx turns.

The name "Asx" is used here to represent either of the amino acids aspartate (Asp) or asparagine (Asn).

Types 

Four types of Asx turn can be distinguished: types I, I’, II and II’. These categories correspond to those of the better-known hydrogen-bonded beta turns, which have four residues and a hydrogen bond between the CO of residue i and the NH of residue i+3. Asx turns and beta turns have structurally similar hydrogen-bonded loops and exhibit sidechain-mainchain mimicry in the sense that the sidechain of residue i of the Asx turn mimics the mainchain of residue i of the beta turn. Regarding their occurrence in proteins, they differ in that type I is the commonest of the four beta turns while type II’ is the commonest of the Asx turns.

Occurrence 
Asx and ST turns both occur frequently at the N-termini of α-helices. as part of Asx motifs or ST motifs such that the Asx, serine or threonine is the N cap residue. They are thus often regarded as helix capping features.

Related motifs 
Similar motifs occur with serine or threonine as residue i, which are called ST turns. In spite of serine and threonine having one less sidechain atom, such that the sidechain-mainchain mimicry of β turns is imperfect, these features occur in proteins as the four types in numbers approaching those of Asx turns. They also exhibit a tendency to substitute each other over evolutionary time.

A proportion of Asx turns are accompanied by a mainchain–mainchain hydrogen bond that qualifies them as Asx motifs.

References

External links
Motivated Proteins
PDBeMotif
  
 .

Protein structural motifs